The Hood Point Lighthouse is a lighthouse in East London, South Africa. It began operating on 4 June 1895. It is 19 m high and centres on a white, round stone tower. The lantern dome is painted red. Before the building of the lighthouse, the Castle Point Lighthouse served the area. It lies beside the Potters Pass Nature Reserve and the West Bank Golf Course.

Cultural heritage 
The Hood Point Lighthouse was declared a provincial heritage site on 22 May 1998, under the National Heritage Resources Act (25/1999).

References 

Lighthouses in South Africa
Lighthouses completed in 1895
East London, Eastern Cape
Buildings and structures in the Eastern Cape